Dimitrios Tsekeridis is a Greek Greco-Roman wrestler. He also won a bronze medal for Greece, at the 2018 Mediterranean Games.

References

External links 
 

Greek male sport wrestlers
Living people
1994 births
Mediterranean Games bronze medalists for Greece
Mediterranean Games medalists in wrestling
Competitors at the 2018 Mediterranean Games
Wrestlers at the 2019 European Games
European Games competitors for Greece
21st-century Greek people